Braif Fatari (born 9 April 2002) is an Indonesian professional footballer who plays as an attacking midfielder for Liga 1 club Persik Kediri and the Indonesia national team.

Club career

Persija Jakarta 
Fatari made his first-team debut for Persija in the 2021 Menpora Cup, a pre-season tournament ahead of the 2021 Liga 1 season, in which he scored a goal in the final against Persib Bandung and helped his club become champions. That goal was the fastest in the tournament as it occurred only 32 seconds after the game started.

International career
Fatari debuted for the Indonesia U-19 team in the 2019 AFF U-19 Youth Championship and scored his first goal for the U-19 squad when it faced Saudi Arabia U-19 in a friendly on 11 September 2020. He received a call to join the senior Indonesian national football team in May 2021. He earned his first senior cap in a 25 May 2021 friendly match in Dubai against Afghanistan.

Career statistics

Club

International

Honours 
Persija Jakarta
 Menpora Cup champions: 2021

Indonesia U-19
 AFF U-19 Youth Championship third place: 2019

References

External links 
 Braif Fatari at Persija.id
 

2002 births
Living people
People from Manado
Sportspeople from North Sulawesi
Indonesian footballers
Association football midfielders
Indonesia international footballers
Indonesia youth international footballers
Liga 1 (Indonesia) players
Persija Jakarta players